Pandanus conoideus is a plant in the Pandanus family from New Guinea. Its fruit is eaten in Papua New Guinea and Papua, Indonesia. The fruit has several names: marita (in Papua New Guinea local language), or buah merah ("red fruit", in Indonesian). The fruit is typically prepared by splitting it, wrapping it in leaves, and cooking it in an earth oven. making it a traditional delicacy. 

Fruits of the pandanus family have specific characteristics that distinguish them from other fruits, including their very concentrated red color, indicating that the fruits are rich in beta carotene.

Description

Has a strap-shaped (lanceolate-elongate) leaves that is mucronate at the tip and has a truncate base, the edges, the adaxial ventral pleats, and on the vein of the leaves are thorny. Single leaf composition with alternating leaf arrangement in a rosette and tristichous. Leaves are flexible, dark green, have parallel leaf veins, have no smell, and are attached directly to the stem with no petiole (sessile). 

The flowers look like jackfruit flowers with reddish color. The individual fruit is a drupe, and these merge to varying degrees forming multiple fruit, can be cylindrical or triangular with blunt rounded tip and heart-shaped base,  in length,  in diameter measured in the middle. 

Typically, the fruit changes from pale red to red brick color as it matures. Depending on its variety, like Mbarugum, Maler, and Magari, desirable attributes include having 5-10 fruits per clump, soft pith, large size, can produce 120 ml oil per kg fruit, have 5-10 samplings per cluster, have numerous root branches.

Cultivation and Uses

Usually cultivated as a source of food and folk medicine. In Indonesia, Buah Merah is used in mixture of chayote leaf vegetable, sweet potato leaf (hipere), or cabbage. As Buah Merah contain large amount of oil, it makes vegetable more savory. Buah merah can also be made into sauce although it is unpopular as it can cause insomnia if consumed in large quantities, on the other hand, in Papua New Guinea, the fruit is made into a red sauce out of it which is called marita sauce. Marita sauce is a ketchup-like substance which is used to flavor food. Others uses include making it into ice cream, pudding, taro, and drinks. In the process of making extract, the leftover pulp can also be made into cake and dodol.

Aside from making it into food, Papuans also used the sweet fruit as bait to capture bird of paradise, tree cuscus, ground rats. As well as combination for cattle fodder. It is also used for construction materials, with the roots are made into ropes and floor mats, and its timber used to construct walls.

Cultivars

Cultivars are separated based on the size, color, and shape of the fruit. Buah Merah is separated to 6 broad variety which include, buah merah panjang (long red), buah merah sedang (medium red), buah merah pendek (short red), buah merah cokelat (brown), buah merah kuning panjang (yellow long), and buah merah kuning pendek (yellow short). Of these, variety are further developed to a number of accessions which are widely cultivated;

Other accessions include Menjib Rumbai, Edewewits, Memeri, Monsrus, Monsor, cultivated in Manokwari and lowland regions. Hityom, Himbiak, Hibcau cultivated in Minyambow District, Manokwari, and highland regions.

Nutrients and phytochemicals

Buah Merah is a good source of Vitamin A with 130 μg of alfa-Carotene, 1980 μg beta-Carotene, and 1460 μg beta-Cryptoxanthin. As well as a good source of natural Vitamin E.

References

conoideus
Tropical fruit
Flora of Western New Guinea
Indonesian cuisine
Papua New Guinean cuisine
Taxa named by Jean-Baptiste Lamarck